Art Museum Riga Bourse is a museum in Riga, Latvia. It was established in 1920 and contains the most extensive collection of world art in Latvia from Ancient Egyptian/Middle Eastern art dating back to 5000 BC to present.

History

Building
In the first half of the 19th century, Riga's trade developed. The merchants established their own permanent organization, the Stock Exchange Committee. At this time, all deals were made in the City Hall (Rathaus).

In 1847, the Great Guild of Riga decided to leave the City Hall and to give the rooms back to the city's court institutions. The members decided to build a new building that could contain the Guild itself, the Stock Exchange Committee and a city theatre.

The architect that had to design the bourse was Harald Julius von Bosse, a Baltic German noble who worked in Saint-Petersburg. His missions were to settle the bourse in the Old Town and also "to adapt to the irregular layout of the blocks, the narrow streets and the dense arrangement of buildings.". Later, the idea of the city theater was rejected because of the risks of fire. Von Bosse started his design in 1850 but the location he chose didn't please the Exchange Committee. Then it was decided in 1851 to construct the building on the corner of Pils iela, Šķūņu iela and Jēkaba iela. Finally, the construction began on 25 March 1852. The architecture of the building was performed in the Venetian Renaissance palazzo style as a symbol of wealth and abundance.

For the façade of the Bourse, it was decided to use a terracotta décor, sculptures with allegorical content and decorative elements. The Danish sculptor David Jensen, also established in Saint-Petersburg, was in charge of this project. Then, on 26 May 1856, the Riga Stock Exchange was ceremoniously opened in the presence of the Russian tsar Alexander II.

In 1937, several buildings were demolished to create the Dome square (Doms laukums).

After the World War II, Latvia became part of the Soviet Union and the building became the House of Science and Technology Propaganda. The façade was repainted in lighter colours (pale pink and brown).

On 24 January 1980, a fire broke out on the upper floor halls. The museum keeps nowadays many scars of this fire. The reconstruction began several months later but stopped in 1982.

On 30 September 2004, the reconstruction was scheduled with the project called "Reconstruction of the former Stock Exchange" but works began only in 2008 and finished in 2011. On 20 August 2011, the building could finally host the foreign art collections and be called the Art Museum Riga Bourse.

Collections
The collections of the Art Museum Riga Bourse have been collected by several art collectors during the 19th and the 20th century.

The first private collection that had been given to the city of Riga was Nikolaus von Himsel's (1729–1764). He was a Baltic German doctor and traveler and bought many oriental objects in order to make a Kunstkammer or art cabinet. Then, Domenico de' Robbiani (1793–1889), an Italian merchant settled in Riga, gave his collection of paintings that gathered artworks from the Netherlands, Germany or France. These two collections were merged and the idea of a museum arose.

Because of a lack of space, some paintings were settled in the Mayor's house whose name was Ludiwig Wilhelm Kerkovius (1831–1904). At this time, several collectors gave their collections: Reinhold Schilling (1819–1888) gave 30 paintings and Kerkovius 26 paintings. The most important gift was the Friedrich Wilhelm Brederlo's collection (1779–1862). He gave 201 paintings, 70 of which were made by Dutch masters.

The collection of the museum contains more than 22,000 works of art, dating from the 4th millennium BC to the 20th century.

Collections

Paintings
 Louis-Léopold Boilly, Portrait of Friedrich Wilhelm Brederlo, oil on canvas.
 Anto Carte, Idole (Révélation), oil, tempera and gouache on canvas, 1932.
 Workshop of Anton van Dyck, Portrait of William II, Prince of Orange-Nassau, oil on canvas, 1632.
 Melchior d'Hondecoeter, Rooster Fight, oil on canvas, 17th century.
 Jacob van Loo, Portrait of a Scientist, oil on canvas, 1647.
 Claude Monet, Winter Landscape (Sandviken), oil on canvas, 1895.
 Niccolò Renieri, Society of Musicians, oil on canvas, 17th century.
 Hubert Robert, The Augustus Temple in Nîmes, oil on canvas, 1783.
 Daniel Seghers et Lucas van Uden, Landscape in a Garland of Flowers, oil on wood, 17th century.
 Bartholomeus Spranger, Adam and Eve, tempera on canvas, 1593–1595.
 Unknown Artist (Frankfurt school), Man with carnation, oil and tempera on wood, early 16th century.

Sculptures
 Luigi Bienaimé, Bacchante, marble, 1847.
 Antonio Canova, Bust of the Goddess Hebe, marble, 1819.
 Jean-Baptiste Carpeaux, Bust of a Bacchante, bronze, 19th century.
 Lower Rhine School, Saint Catherine, wood, 15th century.
 François Pompon, Bear, on-glazed céramic.
 Auguste Rodin, The Kiss, bronze, 1886. 
 Pietro Tenerani, Psyche, marble, middle of the 19th century.
 Viktor Oskar Tilgner, Buste of Hans Makart, bronze, end of the 19th century.

Installation Art
 Dmitry Gutov, Gondola, 2012.

Objets d'Art
 Arita Workshops, Plate, porcelaine, émail et engobe, 18th century.
 Cantonese Workshops, Puzzle Ball with Sticks, ivory, 20th century.
 Fabergé Workshops, Bird Carafe, cristal and silver, 19th century.
 Meissen Workshops, Vase Decorated with Snow Balls, porcelain, c. 1740.
 Ernst August Leuteritz (Meissen Workshops), Epergne, porcelain, on-glaze painting, 1886.
 Sèvres Workshops, The Reaper, bisque porcelain, 1757–1766.
 Wedgwood Workshops, Vase with Relief Decoration, stoneware, 19th century.
 India, Elephant, carved ivory, 19th century.
 Indonesia, Wayang Shadow Theatre, wood, batik, cotton and leather, 21st century.

Gallery

See also 

 List of museums in Latvia

References

External links

  
Art Museum Riga Bourse within Google Arts & Culture

Art museums and galleries in Latvia
Museums in Riga
Art museums established in 1920
1920 establishments in Latvia